Urucurituba is a municipality located in the Brazilian state of Amazonas. Its population was 23,585 (2020) and its area is 2,907 km².

References

Municipalities in Amazonas (Brazilian state)
Populated places on the Amazon